Kim Do-kyoum (born 15 March 1993) is a South Korean short track speed skater. He competed in the 2018 Winter Olympics.

References

External links
 

1993 births
Living people
South Korean male short track speed skaters
Olympic short track speed skaters of South Korea
Short track speed skaters at the 2018 Winter Olympics
World Short Track Speed Skating Championships medalists
Universiade medalists in short track speed skating
Speed skaters from Seoul
Universiade gold medalists for South Korea
Universiade silver medalists for South Korea
Competitors at the 2017 Winter Universiade
South Korean Buddhists